is the 25th studio album by Japanese singer-songwriter Miyuki Nakajima. The album came out a month after a single "Another Name for Life", which was featured as a theme song for TV drama Seija no Koushin aired on TBS and became a smash hit on the charts.

Be Like My Child features the new recording of "Another Name for Life", and "An Affectionate Tale" which was released as a lead single in November 1997. The album also includes three remake versions of the songs that she wrote for other artists in 1997; "Streams of Hearts" recorded by Faye Wong (appeared on her eponymous album), "You Don't Know" by Satoko Ishimine, and "Sea of Night Lights" by Naoto Takenaka (appeared on his Siesta? album).

Like its predecessor Paradise Cafe, Be Like My Child suffered from lackluster commercial performance. 
The album has sold only 100,000 copies to date, although it had initially shipped over 200,000 units and received Gold accreditation by the RIAJ upon its release. It became the artist's first studio album not to reach the top-ten on the chart in 20 years.

Track listing
All songs written and composed by Miyuki Nakajima, arranged by Ichizo Seo (except "Be Like My Child" and "You Don't Know" co-arranged by David Campbell).
"" – 4:47
"" – 5:05
"" [Album Version] – 5:29
"" – 5:16
"" – 4:16
"" – 4:46
"You Don't Know" – 5:42
"" – 5:15
"" – 6:24
"4.2.3." – 12:19

Personnel
Miyuki Nakajima – Lead and harmony vocals
Gregg Bissonette – Drums
Kenny Aronoff – Drums
Hideo Yamaki – Drums
Neil Stubenhaus – Electric bass
Meggen Hagiwara – Electric bass
Bob Glaub – Electric bass
Dean Parks – Acoustic guitar, electric guitar
Michael Thompson – Electric guitar, acoustic guitar, slide guitar
Nozomi Furukawa – Electric guitar
Susumu Nishikawa – Electric guitar
Yoshiaki Kanoh – Electric guitar
Hirokazu Ogura – Electric guitar
Jon Gilutin – Keyboards, acoustic piano, hammond organ,
Yasuharu Nakanishi – Keyboards, acoustic piano
Shingo Kobayashi – Keyboards
Elton Nagata – Keyboards
Joe Sublett – Tenor sax
Keishi Urata – Computer programming
Larry Corbett – Cello
David Campbell – Strings arrangement & conductor
Ichizo Seo – Strings arrangement, keyboards
Suzie Katayama – Strings conductor
Julia Waters – Backing vocals
Maxine Waters – Backing vocals
Oren Waters – Backing vocals
Keiko Wada – Backing vocals
Yuiko Tsubokura – Backing vocals
Mai Yamane – Backing vocals

Charts

Weekly charts

: Limited edition issued on APO-CD

Year-end charts

Certifications

References

Miyuki Nakajima albums
1998 albums
Pony Canyon albums